Piceid is a stilbenoid glucoside and is a major resveratrol derivative in grape juices. It can be found in the bark of Picea sitchensis. It can also be isolated from Reynoutria japonica (syn. Fallopia japonica), the Japanese knotweed (syn. Polygonum cuspidatum).

Resveratrol can be produced from piceid via the mold Aspergillus oryzae. as the fungus produces a potent beta-glucosidase.

trans-Piceid is the glucoside formed with trans-resveratrol, while cis-piceid is formed with cis-resveratrol.

trans-Resveratrol-3-O-glucuronide is one of the two metabolites of trans-piceid in rat.

Resveratrol glucoside from transgenic alfalfa prevents aberrant crypt foci in mice.

See also 
 Resveratroloside (3,5,4'-trihydroxystilbene-4'-O-β-D-glucopyranoside)

References 

Resveratrol glycosides